Susan G. Komen (formerly known as Susan G. Komen for the Cure; originally as The Susan G. Komen Breast Cancer Foundation; often simply as Komen) is a breast cancer organization in the United States.

Komen focuses on patient navigation and advocacy, providing resources for breast cancer patients to understand the American medical system. It has also funded research into the causes and treatment of breast cancer. However, the organization has been mired by controversy over pinkwashing, allocation of research funding, and CEO pay. Its revenue and public perception have steeply declined since 2010.

History
The foundation's namesake, Susan Goodman Komen, died of breast cancer in 1980 at the age of 36. Susan Komen's younger sister, Nancy Brinker, believed that Susan's outcome might have been better if patients knew more about cancer and its treatment, and founded the Susan G. Komen Breast Cancer Foundation in 1982.

In 2008, the 25th anniversary of the organization, the organization changed its name to "Susan G. Komen for the Cure" and its logo to the pink ribbon. The logo was meant to represent Komen's signature Race for the Cure event, a jogging race that raises money for the foundation. 

In December 2009, Brinker was appointed CEO of the organization. Judith A. Salerno became CEO in 2012. In November 2016, the organization announced that Salerno would step down as CEO the following month. In 2017, former fashion executive and breast cancer survivor Paula Schneider took over as CEO.

Activities

Use of funds

In the 2020 fiscal year, Komen reported $195 million in public support, less direct benefits to donors. Of this, $137 million came from contributions, and $72 million from Komen's flagship Race for the Cure and Breast Cancer 3 Day fundraisers. It used the majority (51%) of this money on education efforts, which include advocacy, patient support services, and national campaigns and educational events. A substantial portion of the budget (36%) goes towards fundraising and administrative costs. The remaining 13% is split between research, treatment, and screening efforts.

Grants and awards
Komen provides funding for basic, clinical, and translational breast cancer research and for work in breast health education. As of 2007, it had awarded more than 1,000 breast cancer research grants totaling more than $180 million.

Since 1992, Komen has also annually awarded work in the field of cancer research with the Komen Brinker Award for Scientific Distinction.

In recent years, Komen has more than halved the proportion of fundraising dollars it spends on research grants. In 2011, the foundation spent $63 million (15%) of its donations on research grants and awards.

Global activities
In 2006, Komen joined the US-Middle East Partnership for Breast Cancer Awareness and Research, a Middle East Partnership Initiative program. Komen has programs in Egypt, Israel, United Arab Emirates, Jordan, and Saudi Arabia.

In 2010, Komen was active in over 50 countries, with its largest affiliates in Italy and Germany.

On October 28, 2010, Jerusalem held its first Susan G. Komen Race for the Cure, with over 5,000 Christian, Muslim, and Jewish participants. Before the race, the Old City's walls were illuminated pink by Komen's founder Nancy Brinker, Jerusalem Mayor Nir Barkat, and the Prime Minister of Israel's wife Sara Netanyahu.

Fundraising

Cause marketing
 Komen raised over $36 million a year from over 60 cause marketing partnerships.

Events

The Susan G. Komen Race for the Cure is Komen's flagship fundraising event, and the world's largest funding event for breast cancer. It consists of a series of 5K runs and fitness walks to raise money and awareness for breast cancer.

The first race was run in Dallas, Texas in 1983, with 800 participants. By 2016, over 1.6 million people participated in the race.

The race's primary source of revenue is donations collected by the participants. In 2011, Komen said that three-quarters of the event's proceeds were being used locally to pay for community outreach programs, breast health education, and breast cancer screening and treatment projects run by the Komen affiliate, with the remaining quarter sent to the central organization.

Komen's other nationwide events include:

 Susan G. Komen 3-Day for the Cure – a 60-mile (97 km) walk for women and men: participants walk 60 miles (97 km) in three days to help raise millions of dollars for breast cancer research and patient support programs
 Susan G. Komen Marathon for the Cure – a grassroots fundraising program offering fitness enthusiasts the chance to join in the fight against breast cancer by running or walking a full (42.2 km or 26.2 mi) or half (21.1 km or 13.1 mi) marathon.
 Susan G. Komen Passionately Pink for the Cure – a year-round fundraising and education program allowing participants to choose any date, invite friends, wear pink, have fun and raise money for the cause.
 Susan G. Komen Bowl for the Cure – a year-round fund-raising and breast cancer awareness initiative founded in 2000 and sponsored by USBC and The Bowling Foundation.

Controversy and criticism
In 2010, Komen was rated one of the most trusted nonprofit organizations in America. But in light of scandals breaking between 2011 and 2017, revenue declined by roughly 80% and a number of affiliates merged or dissolved. Komen's ranking on Charity Navigator, which was four stars (the highest rating) in 2013, sank to two stars in 2014. As of 2021, it ranks three stars, with a score of 82 out of 100.

Pinkwashing

Komen is a key entity in the controversy over "pinkwashing". The term has been used to describe two different situations: (1) organizations getting disproportionate publicity for donating very little, and (2) organizations using the pink ribbon to promote products that may be carcinogenic.

Donation criticisms
Komen benefits from corporate partnerships, receiving over $55 million a year from 216 corporate sponsors. Critics say many of these promotions are deceptive, benefiting the companies more than the charity, and promoting products that may cause cancer.

Some campaigns required that consumers mail proof of purchase for a promoted item before the manufacturer donates a few cents per purchase to charity; some have a cap on the maximum amount donated, with all sales beyond this limit benefiting only the company, not the promoted cause.
Since its Save Lids to Save Lives campaign began in 1998, Yoplait has donated more than $25 million to Komen. In 2010, its annual maximum commitment was raised to $1.6 million.
In return, a major sponsor such as Yoplait obtains an exclusive contract; no other yogurt manufacturer (such as Dreyer's, which inquired in 2000) may use the branding. In 2002, credit card operator American Express launched a "Charge for a Cure" campaign that claimed that "in the search for a cure, every dollar counts." The amount donated per qualifying transaction, regardless of the purchase amount, was one cent.

In 2006, Major League Baseball (MLB) partnered with Komen by selling and donating amounts from pink MLB Louisville Slugger bats, pink baseballs, and necklaces sold. On Mother's Day, breast cancer survivors were eligible to be bat girls in games where pink bats were used. MLB, a $1.2 billion industry, donates around $100,000 a year.

Health criticisms
 Several water bottle retailers have partnered with Komen. Water cooler bottles made of polycarbonate may contain BPA, which has been linked to breast cancer tumor growth. For the 2008 model year, Ford Motor Company built a branded limited edition of 2,500 Ford Mustang motorcars with a "Warriors in Pink" package as part of its long-running association with Komen; an additional 1,000 were offered for 2009's model year. A longitudinal study found that women employed in the automotive plastics industry are almost five times as likely to develop breast cancer before menopause than women in a control group.

In April 2010, Komen paired with fast food restaurant chain KFC to offer "Buckets for the Cure", a promotion in which fried and grilled chicken was sold in pink, branded buckets. The collaboration was criticized by media outlets, including The Colbert Report and Bitch magazine, and raised questions about promoting unhealthy eating habits. KFC contributed over $4.2 million to Komen, the largest single contribution in the organization's history. The partnership with KFC, which has since ended, allowed Komen "to reach many millions of women that they had been unable to reach before", said Brinker.

In April 2011, Komen introduced a perfume brand, "Promise Me", promoted by Brinker on the Home Shopping Network, only to encounter opposition due to its potentially harmful ingredients coumarin, oxybenzone, toluene and galaxolide. Komen said it intended to reformulate the perfume but did not withdraw existing stocks of the "Promise Me" product from distribution.

In October 2014, the Houston-based oil field services company Baker Hughes was reported to have produced 1,000 pink drill bits to raise breast cancer awareness. The bits are used to break up geologic formations in oil patches for hydraulic fracturing. These ties have been criticized, because more than a third of the more than 700 chemicals used in fracking are endocrine disruptors and at least a quarter increase the risk of cancer.

Legal battles over trademarking
In 2007, the organization changed its name to Susan G. Komen for the Cure and trademarked the running ribbon as part of its branding strategy. Komen has come under fire for legal action against other organizations using the phrase "for the cure" in their names. An August 2010 Wall Street Journal article detailed a case in which Komen told the organization Uniting Against Lung Cancer no longer to use the name "Kites for the Cure" for its annual fund-raising event. Komen also wrote to the organization to warn it "against any use of pink in conjunction with 'cure.'" More than 100 small charities have received legal opposition from Komen for use of the words "for the cure" in their names. Among the offending organizations and events were "Par for the Cure", "Surfing for a Cure", "Cupcakes for a Cure" and "Mush for the Cure".

Komen says that the organization protects its trademarks as a matter of financial stewardship to prevent confusion among donors; others suggest that the trademark issue is more about dominating the pink ribbon market.

Critics have also asserted that the slogan itself implies the majority of Komen's income will fund research for a cure, instead of mere treatment or detection, however Komen's own figures for the 2020 fiscal year reveal that only 5% of their total budget goes to research. In the words of cancer survivor Alicia Staley, "an organization that is actively pursuing other small charities over the use of the term 'for the cure' does not spend the majority of their own funds towards research for a cure."

Relationship with Planned Parenthood
Beginning in 2007, Komen granted money to pay for 170,000 clinical breast exams and 6,400 mammogram referrals through Planned Parenthood Federation of America and affiliates. Komen had said its affiliates provide funds for screening, education and treatment programs in dozens of communities where Planned Parenthood is the only place poor, uninsured or under-insured women can receive these services. Planned Parenthood clinics do not perform mammograms, instead making referrals for their patients to sites that do them.

On January 31, 2012, Komen stopped funding exams provided by Planned Parenthood, citing a congressional investigation by Representative Cliff Stearns and a newly created internal rule about not funding organizations under federal, state or local investigation. While conservative religious and anti-abortion groups applauded the move, it was denounced by several editorials, women's health advocacy groups, and politicians.

In the 24 hours after the news broke, Planned Parenthood received more than $400,000 from 6,000 donors, followed by pledges of a $250,000 matching grant from New York City Mayor Michael Bloomberg and a $250,000 gift from a foundation run by the CEO of Bonanza Oil Co. in Dallas to replace the lost funding.

Four days later, Komen's board of directors reversed the decision and announced that it would amend the policy to "make clear that disqualifying investigations must be criminal and conclusive in nature and not political". Several top-level staff members resigned from Komen during the controversy. In August, Brinker announced she would leave her CEO role. The number of participants at various Komen fundraising events dropped 15–30% in 2012. The Susan G. Komen 3-Day for the Cure fundraising walks were scaled back to seven US cities in 2013, from 14, due to a 37% drop in participation over the preceding four years. In January 2014 it was reported that the foundation saw a decline of 22% in contributions in the year following their decision to cease (and then continue) funding for Planned Parenthood.

Karen Handel, the Brinker protégée whose opposition to abortion was at the center of the Planned Parenthood controversy, resigned and has published a book on the controversy titled Planned Bullyhood.

Embryonic stem cell research

In 2006, Komen wrote in its newsletter that embryonic stem cell research had promise for curing breast cancer. One such grant recipient was Robert A. Weinberg, Ph.D. through Whitehead Institute for Biomedical Research at MIT. In 2011, the anti-abortion Coalition on Abortion/Breast Cancer said that Komen gave $12 million to institutions such as Johns Hopkins School of Medicine and the U.S. National Cancer Institute that funded stem cell research, which the Coalition considered to be abortion. In 2012, Komen said that it did not fund stem cell research and never has. According to Science magazine, Christopher Umbricht got nearly $600,000 from Komen for molecular marker research at Johns Hopkins that includes stem cells.

CEO salary
According to Komen's 2011–12 IRS Form 990 declarations, Brinker made $684,717 that fiscal year, a 64% raise. Komen said the last CEO salary hike had taken place in November 2010. Charity Navigator continued to give Komen very favorable overall ratings on the basis of figures Komen had declared to the IRS, but Charity Navigator president and CEO Ken Berger called this compensation "extremely high".

After the release of this information, Judith A. Salerno was named CEO, with Brinker named Founder and Chair of Global Strategy.

See also
List of health-related charity fundraisers

References

Further reading 

 King, Samantha (2006). Pink Ribbons, Inc.: Breast Cancer and the Politics of Philanthropy. University of Minnesota Press.

External links
 
 National Race for the Cure website
 Huffington Post Article
BreastCancerTrials.org

5K runs
Breast cancer organizations
Cancer fundraisers
Cancer charities in the United States
Charities based in Texas
Organizations established in 1982
Recurring events established in 1983
1982 establishments in Texas
Medical and health organizations based in Texas
Medical and health foundations in the United States
Breast cancer awareness
Non-profit organizations based in Texas